Lucas Sithole defeated the two-time defending champion David Wagner in the final,  3–6, 6–4, 6–4 to win the quad singles wheelchair tennis title at the 2013 US Open.

There was no competition in 2012 due to a schedule conflict with the 2012 Summer Paralympics.

Draw

Final

Round robin
Standings are determined by: 1. number of wins; 2. number of matches; 3. in two-players-ties, head-to-head records; 4. in three-players-ties, percentage of sets won, or of games won; 5. steering-committee decision.

External links
Main Draw

Wheelchair Quad Singles
U.S. Open, 2013 Quad Singles